Gevar Rural District is a rural district (dehestan) in Sarduiyeh District, Jiroft County, Kerman Province, Iran. At the 2006 census, its population was 5,050, in 1,234 families. The rural district has 77 villages.

References 

Rural Districts of Kerman Province
Jiroft County